Jesper Hjorth (born April 3, 1975) is a Danish former professional association footballer, who predominantly played in the striker position. He played 10 games and scored one goal for the Denmark under-21 national team.

Born in Odense, Hjorth started his senior career at Odense BK in the Danish Superliga championship, making his league debut in November 1994. The highlight of his career came in December 1994, at the age of just 19. In the 1994-95 UEFA Cup, Hjorth played at the Santiago Bernabéu stadium against Real Madrid to help Odense BK knock Real Madrid out of the tournament. He also scored against Madrid in the first leg at home. Having scored nine goals in 61 league games, Hjorth left Odense BK in January 1999, and joined Herning Fremad in the Danish 1st Division.

In November 1999, Hjorth moved abroad to play for English team Darlington in the Football League Two tournament. Having scored 6 goals in 45 first team appearances for Darlington, Hjorth moved back to Danish football to play for B1909 in June 2001. In July 2003, Hjorth went on to play amateur football in Næsby.

References

1975 births
Living people
Danish men's footballers
Danish Superliga players
Denmark under-21 international footballers
Odense Boldklub players
Darlington F.C. players
Footballers from Odense
English Football League players
Danish expatriate men's footballers
Expatriate footballers in England
Association football forwards
Danish expatriate sportspeople in England